Audax UK or AUK is a British cycling club that oversees randonneuring (long-distance cycling) in the United Kingdom. It was formed in 1976 to help British riders complete the qualifying rides for entry to the Paris-Brest-Paris randonee. Audax UK is recognised by Audax Club Parisien as the official brevet-coordinating organization for the United Kingdom, although in practice events in Northern Ireland are organised by Audax Ireland. Audax UK members sometimes informally describe themselves as AUKs.

By the end of 2018, Audax UK membership had exceeded 8,000 for the first time and 2019 will see the highest number of "calendar" events (i.e. mass rides that take place on a specific day) yet.  These events are open to all riders, whether they are Audax UK members or not (non-members pays a small fee for "temporary membership" for the duration of the event). The official magazine, Arrivée, is published four times per year.

Events

AUK coordinates and validates Audax events but does not organise any events directly; these are typically organised by existing cycle clubs, local Cycling UK groups, or informal local Audax groups such as "Audax Club Mid-Essex" or "Audax Ecosse". The events are non-competitive, with riders needing only to complete the ride distance within specified time limits. There are three types of rides:
Calendar events are organised with some similarities to sportives, although with more emphasis on self-sufficiency. Rides of 200 km and above are known as Brevets de Randonneurs, whereas rides under 200 km are known as Brevets Populaires.
A "permanent" is a designated route which can be ridden by the rider on a day of their choice. The attempt is subsequently validated by AUK. The routes have usually been used for calendar events in the past.
A "DIY" allows the rider to design their own route (which must be validated by "proof of passage" or a GPS track) and the day of the ride.

In the 2017–18 season, 21,585 rides were completed and validated on 541 calendar events.

Notable rides
The notable calendar events include London–Edinburgh–London, held every four years; the National 400; London-Wales-London (formerly the Severn Across), a 400 km ride from West London to Chepstow in Wales and back again; the Bryan Chapman Memorial, a 600 km ride from South to North Wales and back again; and the Mille Pennines, a 1000 km ride held in Northern England. The "Dorset Coast 200 km" is the oldest continuously organised (since 1978) 200 km calendar event in the UK.

In the 2019 season, the most popular events for each distance were:
100 km – Devon Delight, Newton Abbot
200 km – Ditchling Devil, Wimbledon  
300 km – 3Down, Chalfont St Peter
400 km – Brevet Cymru, Chepstow
600 km – Bryan Chapman Memorial, Chepstow

National 400
The National is a 400 km "flagship" calendar event originally organised by the CTC in 1982. This was re-established in 2012 and has been organised by a different local group each summer: 
1982 – Charterhouse School, organised by CTC
1983 – Charterhouse School, organised by CTC
1984 – Lincoln Cathedral, organised by Witham Section
1985 – Charterhouse School, organised by CTC
1988 – Oxford, organised by Oxford CTC
1993 – Exeter Quay, organised by Devon DA
1995 – Poole Harbour, organised by Wessex CTC
2012 – East Anglia, organised by Norfolk Audax
2013 – West Country, organised by Exeter Wheelers
2014 – Yorkshire Dales and North Pennines, organised by VC167
2015 – Scottish Highlands, organised by CTC Highland
2016 – Cheshire and Wales, organised by Peak Audax
2017 – Mid Wales and the Marches, organised by Shropshire CTC
2018, 2019, 2020 – not held

Arrows
The Easter Arrow and Summer Arrow are team events in the flèche style, in which teams have 24 hours to ride as far as possible and finish in York.

Time limits
The time limits for Brevets de Randonneurs Mondiaux rides are set by ACP as follows:
♦ 200 km – 13 hours 30 minutes
♦ 300 km – 20 hours
♦ 400 km – 27 hours
♦ 600 km – 40 hours

Brevet Populaire events can be run at slower speeds than BRM events.

Points and awards
Points are awarded on the basis of 1 point for every full 100 km ridden on rides of 200 km and above. The AUK season runs from 1 October to 30 September each year. There are trophies for the highest scoring individuals and clubs each year. In 2018 these were won by Shaun Hargreaves and Four Corners Audax respectively.

Audax UK allow members to qualify for numerous awards, as set out in the tables below. All distances are in kilometres (km).

In parallel to the main points system, there is the Audax Altitude Award (AAA) system for grimpeurs. AAA points are awarded on the basis of 1 point for every 1000m of climbing, rounded to the nearest quarter point and subject to a minimum climb rate which depends on the distance.

Distance Awards
Medals or cloth badges are available for individual rides of the following distances: 50 km, 100 km, 150 km, 200 km, 300 km, 400 km, 600 km and 1,000 km.

Randonneur Awards
The Randonneur awards aim to encourage riders to progress through increasing distances, and are awarded for rides completed within a single season.

The Super Randonneur is awarded for completing 200 km, 300 km, 400 km and 600 km rides in one season. 458 riders completed an SR in the 2017 season. Entrants to Paris-Brest-Paris must ride this series in the same year as the PBP ride to qualify for a place. Some groups organise their own "Super Randonneur Series" of these distances, such as the Mid-Essex series and the Wessex series.

Brevet Awards
The Brevet awards encourage riders to keep riding over several seasons, with the exception of the Brevet 500 which is aimed at younger riders and is awarded for rides within a single season.

Special Awards

Notes to tables
 M = medal, CB = cloth badge
 10 rides include rides ridden in Brevet 500; alternatively, 5x200km Audax events in one Season
 alternatively, 10x200km Audax events
 plus additional Audax events to top up to 5000 km
 plus additional Audax events to top up to 25000 km; 200k, 300k, 400k and 600k rides are officially defined as a Super Randonneur series and as such longer events may substitute for shorter ones of these
 each event must take place in a different country; additional levels of the award also exist, e.g.: ISR(2C) if they are held between 2 continents

See also
British Cycling
Cycling Time Trials
Cycling UK

Notes

References
Audax UK (2011).  Audax UK Handbook 2011.  Ashford, UK: Invicta Press.  Retrieved 2012-02-02.

External links
Audax UK
RUSA
Audax Club Parisien

Cycling organisations in the United Kingdom
1976 establishments in the United Kingdom
Sports organizations established in 1976